Raalte is a municipality and a town in the heart of the region of Salland in the Dutch province of Overijssel.

Population centres

The municipality consists of the following towns and villages. Raalte is the main place of the municipality, with over 20,000 mostly Roman Catholic inhabitants. It is a regional market, education and shopping centre.

Transport
Raalte railway station and Heino railway stations are located along the minor railroad Zwolle – Enschede. Frequency:  mostly twice per hour.

An important road for motorists is the N348 Deventer – Wesepe (mun. Olst-Wijhe – Raalte – Lemelerveld – Ommen ( in northeasterly direction from Deventer). In Raalte it crosses a road (N35) from Zwolle going south-east over Heino, Raalte, Mariënheem and Nijverdal to Wierden, where it continues as a highway (A35) to Almelo and Enschede.

Economy
Raalte has a lot of small industrial enterprises, many of them processing agricultural products. For the local economy, trade, agriculture (especially breeding cattle) and tourism are more important.

Sights and events
 Once a year there is a harvest festival called Stöppelhaene. Its name in regional dialect means: a rooster made out of straw. It is held in Raalte in the last week of August. The event was established in 1950. 
 Luttenberg is known for its motorcycle races every summer. 
 Luttenberg is also known for its Lourdes Cave, an artificial cave with a statue of the Virgin Mary of Lourdes, situated at the centre of the village opposing the parish church.
 South-west of Heino, just across the railroad and the border to the municipality Olst-Wijhe, stands the castle Nijenhuis. It hosts an important art museum ( Constant Permeke, Van Gogh et al.). Around the castle is a sculpture garden (Ossip Zadkine et al.).  
 Near Luttenberg there is a small hill (Luttenberg) covered with heath and forest, where nice walks can be made.
 The Roman Catholic basilica "Kruisverheffing" (Exaltation of the Holy Cross) in Raalte. This Neo-Gothic church, designed by Alfred Tepe, was built in 1892. During "Stöppelhaene" there is an exposition of mosaics made out of seeds, representing religious themes. The festival starts and ends with special Holy Masses in this church. 
 The small "Plaskerk", the oldest building in the centre of Raalte, is a Protestant church. A typical example of Dutch religious tolerance was the fact, that the Protestants were allowed to hold their Sunday services in the big Roman Catholic church, as the Plaskerk was restored in 2006.
 Once a year there is a blues festival called "Ribs & Blues". The festival is held close to Ascension Day. Some bands and artists that have played during this festival over the last few years include: The Beach Boys, Status Quo, and Candy Dulfer.

Notable people 
 Petronella van Woensel (1785 in Raalte – 1839) a Dutch painter and a graphic artist
 Albert Jan Maat (born 1953 in Heino) a Dutch politician and Member of the European Parliament
 Stijn Jaspers (1961 in Raalte – 1984) a Dutch runner, competed at the 1984 Summer Olympics 
 Harry van Bommel (born 1962 in Helmond) a Dutch politician, anti-globalisation activist and former educator
 Jan Smeekens (born 1987 in Raalte) a Dutch speed skater, silver medallist at the 2014 Winter Olympics

Gallery

References

External links

Official website
Tourist Office in Raalte

 
Municipalities of Overijssel
Populated places in Overijssel
Salland